Alvin Burroughs (November 21, 1911 – August 1, 1950) was an American swing jazz drummer.

Burroughs played in Kansas City with Walter Page's Blue Devils in 1928-29 and then with Alphonse Trent's territory band in 1930.

Moving to Chicago, he played with Hal Draper's Arcadians (1935), Horace Henderson (July 1937–38), and Earl Hines (September 1938–40); with Hines he recorded extensively. In the early 1940s he worked with Milt Larkin's band at the Rhumboogie Club, Benny Carter (late 1942), and Red Allen (late 1944-April 46), in addition to leading his own band. He was in George Dixon's quartet in 1950 when he died of a heart attack. He never recorded as a leader.

References

Bibliography
Scott Yanow,  Alvin Burroughs] at Allmusic

1911 births
1950 deaths
American jazz drummers
20th-century American drummers
American male drummers
20th-century American male musicians
American male jazz musicians